Voskehat may refer to:
Voskehat, Aragatsotn, Armenia
Voskehat, Armavir, Armenia